Vicente Aguilar Cubero (April 5, 1808 – April 26, 1861) was a Costa Rican politician.

Biography
He was the son of José Alejo Aguilar and Joaquina Cubero Escalante. He married on January 27, 1839 with Maria Dolores Salazar y Aguado.

Cubero played an important role in the development of coffee production in Costa Rica on a commercial level in the country and in doing so became one of the richest men in the country. During several years he had a commercial society with Juan Rafael Mora Porras, President of the Republic from 1849 to 1859.

During his political career he has several positions, among them Magistrate of the Supreme Court of Justice, Vice-president of the Republic and President of the Congress (September–October 1856), Minister of Property, War, and the Navy (1859–1860), Second in designation to the Presidency (1860–1861) and then Secretary of Property, War and the Navy (1860–1861).

Vice presidents of Costa Rica
1808 births
1861 deaths
Presidents of the Legislative Assembly of Costa Rica
Government ministers of Costa Rica
19th-century Costa Rican judges
Supreme Court of Justice of Costa Rica judges